Reply to Li Shuyi is a poem written on May 11, 1957 by Mao Zedong to Li Shuyi, a friend of Mao's first wife Yang Kaihui and the widow of the executed Communist leader Liu Zhixun. In the poem, "poplar" refers to Yang Kaihui, whose surname Yang means "poplar", and who also had been executed; and "willow" is the literal meaning of Liu's surname. Wu Gang is a man who, according to Chinese legend, lives on the moon, and was forced by the gods to fell a laurel tree forever.

References

Chinese poems
1957 poems
Works by Mao Zedong